Lady Cha Dal-rae's Lover is a 2018 South Korean morning soap opera. It aired on KBS2 from September 3, 2018.

This followed the last-ever TV Novel drama, Through the Waves. It marked the revival of the KBS2 morning drama format, nearly seven years after Pit-a-pat, My Love was replaced by the TV Novel series in 2011. Due to low ratings averaging 7.3%, the morning drama timeslot was quickly cancelled again, and was replaced by reruns of KBS1's daily dramas.

Plot 
This is a drama which tells the life of three middle-aged woman who  graduated from the same high school.

Cast

Main 
 Ha Hee-ra as Cha Jin-ok
 Ahn Sun-young as Oh Dal-sook
 Ko Eun-mi as Nam Mi-rae
 Kim Eung-soo as Kim Bok-man
 Kim Hyeong-beom as Tak Ho-se
 Jung Wook as Kam Sun-ho

Supporting 
Kim Ha-rim as Kim So-young
Ahn Jae-sung as Kim Dae-young
Kim Se-hee as Tak Il-ran
Kim Ji-in as Tak Yi-ran 
Jun Ho-young as Kang Dong-hyun
Hong Il-kwon as Baek Hyun-woo
Kim Jung-min as Baek Ho

Awards and nominations

References

External links
  

Korean Broadcasting System television dramas
Korean-language television shows
2018 South Korean television series debuts
2019 South Korean television series endings